Tales of Magic, also known as Merlin's Cave and Wonderful, Wonderful Tales From Around the World, and known in Japan as Manga Fairy Tales of the World (まんが世界昔ばなし Manga sekai mukashi banashi?) is a Japanese anime anthology series based on fairy tales and classic stories, produced by Dax International with Madhouse.

Premise 
It aired in Japan on TBS from October 7, 1976, to March 28, 1979. The series features adaptations of fairy tales, legends, literature classics and famous characters biographies.

It consists of 127 episodes, each one combining two different stories, for a total of 181 story arcs (excluding reruns) which run for 10 minutes each, except for 13 mid-series stories that covered an entire half-hour episode. Some story arcs in the second half of the series are told over several episodes, as in the case of A Little Princess lasting 11 episodes, and Les Misérables, which lasted 13 episodes for a total running time of 120 minutes.

Every tale is produced by a different staff who gave each episode their own distinctive style. Among the many artists who worked on the series there are: Osamu Dezaki, Akio Sugino, Yoshifumi Kondō, Yoshiaki Kawajiri, Toyoo Ashida and Shuichi Seki.

The narration is provided by Mariko Miyagi, who also voices all the characters in the series along with Akira Nagoya.

Selected episodes of the show were released during the 1980s in English-speaking countries by different companies under various titles. Embassy Home Entertainment released it under the titles Tales of Magic and Merlin's Cave (Merlin's Magic Cave on the videotape cover), while another version was titled Wonderful, Wonderful Tales From Around the World. Some episodes like Alice's Adventures in Wonderland or The Snow Queen were adapted by Fred Laderman and broadcast by BFA Educational Media on CBS as single half-hour specials. The series was also released in several other countries such as Italy, France, Spain, Portugal, Germany, Sweden, Norway, Quebec, Brazil, South Korea and in the Middle East.

Music 
Opening Theme:

1) "Uba uba ukyakya (ウバ・ウバ・ウキャキャ)" by Mariko Miyagi

2) "Watashi o yobu no ha dare (私を呼ぶのは誰)" by Mariko Miyagi

3) "Mama! himi tsu da yo (ママ!ひみつだよ)" by Mariko Miyagi

Ending Theme:

1) "Yume o mi ta no (夢をみたの)" by Mariko Miyagi

2) "Me mo wa ru (めもわーる)" by Mariko Miyagi

3) "Tenshi ga tooru (天使がとおる)" by Mariko Miyagi

References

External links 

 Official website at sekaimukashibanashi.net
 Official website at madhouse.co.jp
 Manga Sekai Mukashi Banashi (anime) at Anime News Network's encyclopedia
 Manga Sekai Mukashi Banashi at IMDb